Moses und Aron (English: Moses and Aaron) is a three-act opera by Arnold Schoenberg with the third act unfinished. The German libretto is by the composer after the Book of Exodus. Hungarian composer Zoltán Kocsis completed the last act with Schoenberg's heirs' permission in 2010, but  Moses und Aron was almost always performed as Schoenberg left it in 1932, with only two of the planned three acts completed.

Compositional history
Moses und Aron has its roots in Schoenberg's earlier agitprop play, Der biblische Weg (The Biblical Way, 1926–27), a response in dramatic form to the growing anti-Jewish movements in the German-speaking world after 1848 and a deeply personal expression of his own "Jewish identity" crisis.  The latter began with a face-to-face encounter with anti-Semitic agitation at Mattsee, near Salzburg, during the summer of 1921, when he was forced to leave the resort because he was a Jew, although he had converted to Protestantism in 1898.  It was a traumatic experience to which Schoenberg would frequently refer, and of which a first mention appears in a letter addressed to Wassily Kandinsky (April 1923): "I have at last learnt the lesson that has been forced upon me this year, and I shall never forget it.  It is that I am not a German, not a European, indeed perhaps scarcely even a human being (at least, the Europeans prefer the worst of their race to me), but that I am a Jew."

Schoenberg's statement echoed that of Gustav Mahler, a convert to Catholicism, some years earlier: "I am thrice homeless: as a Bohemian among Austrians, as an Austrian among the Germans, and as a Jew throughout the entire world. I am an intruder everywhere, welcome nowhere."

The Mattsee experience was destined to change the course of Schoenberg's life and to influence his musical creativity, leading him first to write Der Biblische Weg, in which the central protagonist Max Aruns (Moses-Aaron) is partially modelled on Theodor Herzl, the founder of modern political Zionism; then to proclaim in Moses und Aron his uncompromising monotheistic creed; and finally, upon his official return to Judaism in 1933, to embark for more than a decade on a relentless mission to save European Jewry from impending doom.  Der Biblische Weg should be considered as both a personal and political play.  Moses, at the center of the biblical Exodus story, had become from the time of Heinrich Heine to that of Herzl and Schoenberg, the ideal incarnation of a national and spiritual redeemer.

From the sketchy outline of the play (1926) to its final version (1927) and to the inception of Moses und Aron as an oratorio (1928), it then became an opera, and the first two acts were composed between 1930 and 1932. Schoenberg often stated his intention to complete the work but composed only a few sketches for Act 3. Despite its unfinished status, it is widely regarded as Schoenberg's masterpiece.

Schoenberg's title may have omitted an "A" in Aaron's name because the composer was severely superstitious about the number 13; "Moses und Aaron" has 13 letters.

Zoltán Kocsis (Hungarian conductor, composer and pianist) had received permission from Schoenberg's heirs in 2009 to complete the last act. His version was premiered in concert at Budapest on 16 January 2010.

Performance history
As Schoenberg always intended to finish the work, the opera was not performed during his lifetime. However, the first public performance of music from the opera was of Der Tanz um das goldene Kalb in concert at Darmstadt on 2 July 1951, just 11 days before the composer's death. There was a concert performance of the two acts in Hamburg on 12 March 1954 with Hans Herbert Fiedler as Moses and Helmut Krebs as Aron, conducted by Hans Rosbaud. The first staging was in Zurich at the Stadttheater on 6 June 1957, again with Hans Herbert Fiedler as Moses and conducted by Hans Rosbaud, but with Helmut Melchert as Aron.

Georg Solti conducted the first performance at the Royal Opera House, London on 28 June 1965. The singers were Forbes Robinson (Moses) and Richard Lewis (Aron). The American premiere was produced by Sarah Caldwell's Opera Company of Boston on 30 November 1966 with Donald Gramm as Moses, Richard Lewis as Aron, Harry Theyard as the young man, Maxine Makas as the young girl, Eunice Alberts as the invalid woman, and Osbourne McConathy conducting. The New York premiere was presented by the New York City Opera conducted by Christopher Keene, with Richard Cross in the role of Moses and Thomas Young as Aaron, directed by Hans Neugebauer. The Metropolitan Opera did not stage the work until 20 February 1999, under the baton of James Levine with John Tomlinson in his debut role as Moses and Philip Langridge as Aron. The first performance in a communist country was in 1988 at Staatsoper Berlin as staged by Ruth Berghaus and conducted by Friedrich Goldmann.

In 1973, the work was also made into a film by Jean-Marie Straub and Danièle Huillet.
A 2006 production by the Vienna State Opera has been published as a DVD.

Music
Moses and Aron is based entirely on a single tone row, itself constructed from cells:

This row is then combined with versions of itself so that the first half of each still provide six different pitches:

Roles

Synopsis

Time: Thirteenth century B.C. 
Place: Egypt and the desert.

Act 1
Moses, in the presence of the burning bush, reluctantly receives from God the order to become a prophet and free Israel from bondage in Egypt. Moses asks to be spared such a task, he is old and though he can think, he cannot speak. God assures him that he will put words in his heart and orders him to find his brother Aron.

In the desert Moses greets Aron, who will have to serve as his spokesman, explaining his difficult ideas in terms the people can understand. Soon they start misunderstanding each other: Moses assures him that love is the key to unlocking this mystery, but Aron praises God for hearing prayers and receiving offerings. Moses cautions that the purification of one's own thinking is the only reward to be expected from tributes.

In the Israelite community there are many who claim to have seen God in different manifestations. A young couple discusses Moses' having been chosen to lead the Israelites. The elders are afraid that because he killed an Egyptian guard, bringing retribution on his people, he will get them into further trouble. One man expresses hope that the new idea of a single God will prove stronger than Egypt's multiple gods, stronger than Pharaoh's grip. The people reiterate this hope, looking at the arriving Moses and Aron, who keep changing roles so that it is difficult to distinguish one from the other. Trying to explain how God can be perceived only within oneself, Moses grows frustrated by Aron's glibness, which seems to weaken his idea. Aron defies Moses, seizing his rod and throwing it down, whereupon it turns into a serpent; this, says Aron, shows how a rigid idea can be made flexible. The people wonder how this new God can help them against Pharaoh's might. Aron shows them another wonder: Moses' hand, which appears leprous, is healed when he places it over his heart, wherein God dwells. The people now believe God will strengthen their own hands: they will throw off their shackles and escape into the wilderness, where Moses says purity of thought will provide the only sustenance they need. Pouring Nile water, which appears to change into blood, Aron interprets the sign, saying they will no longer sweat blood for the Egyptians but will be free. When the water appears clear again, Aron says Pharaoh will drown in it. Promised a land of milk and honey, the people pledge their allegiance to this new God.

Act 2

INTERLUDE. Moses has been gone for forty days and the people are left in the desert waiting. Unnerved by his long absence, the people wonder whether God and Moses have abandoned them.

At the foot of the mountain, Aron, a priest and a group of elders wonder why Moses has been gone so long, as licentiousness and disorder prevail among the people. Aron assures them that once Moses has assimilated God's intent, he will present it in a form the people can grasp. To the anxious people who flock to him for advice, however, he admits that Moses may have defected or be in danger. Seeing them unruly and ready to kill their priests, Aron tries to calm them by giving them back their other gods: he will let them have an image they can worship. A golden calf is set up and offerings are brought, including self-sacrifices at the altar. An emaciated youth who protests the false image is killed by tribal leaders. Priests sacrifice four virgins, and the people, who have been drinking and dancing, turn wild and orgiastic. When they have worn themselves out, and many have fallen asleep, a lookout sees Moses returning from the mountain. Destroying the golden calf, Moses demands an accounting from Aron, who justifies his indulgence of the people by saying that no word had come from Moses. While Moses' love is entirely for his idea of God, Aron says, the people too need his love and cannot survive without it. In despair Moses smashes the tablets of the laws he has brought down from the mountain. Aron denounces him as fainthearted, saying he himself keeps Moses' idea alive by trying to explain it. Led by a pillar of fire in the darkness, which turns to a pillar of cloud by day, the people come forth, encouraged once more to follow God's sign to the Promised Land. Moses distrusts the pillar as another vain image, but Aron says it guides them truly. As Aron joins the people in their exodus, Moses feels defeated. By putting words and images to what cannot be expressed, Aron has falsified Moses' absolute perception of God, lamenting that he lacks the capability to speak.

Act 3
(Schoenberg never composed the music for the final act's single scene.) Aron is put under arrest, accused of fostering idle hopes with his imagery such as that of the Promised Land. Aron insists that Moses' word would mean nothing to the people unless interpreted in terms they can understand. Moses declares that such sophistry will win the people's allegiance to the imagery and not God; by misrepresenting the true nature of God, Aron keeps leading the people back into the wilderness. When Moses tells the soldiers to let Aron go free, Aron falls dead. Even in the wilderness, Moses says, the people will reach their destined goal — unity with God.

Instrumentation
The work is scored for the following orchestra:

woodwind: 3 flutes  (2nd and 3rd doubling on piccolo), 3 oboes, English horn, 3 clarinets (3rd doubling on sopranino clarinet), bass clarinet, 3 bassoons (3rd doubling on contrabassoon);
brass: 4 horns, 3 trumpets, 3 trombones, bass tuba;
percussion: timpani, glockenspiel, xylophone, flexatone, bells in A, B flat, f and c', bass drum, cymbals, tam-tam, gong, big tenor drum, small drum, tambourine, ratchet, bells of undefined pitch;
Other: 2 mandolins, celesta, piano, harp, strings;
On-stage: English horn, horn, 2 trumpets, 2 trombones, 2 mandolins, 2 guitars (T. 929–957), bass drum – more thuds, cymbals, sleigh bells, gongs in various pitches (T. 1084–1098 and T. 1102–1127), 3 clarinets, 3 horns or 3 bassoons (T. 1082–1128);
Behind the stage: piccolo, flute, clarinet, trombone, timpani, xylophone, 2–4 mandolins, piano (T. 1084–1098 and T. 1102–1109)

Recordings
1954: Hans Herbert Fiedler, Helmut Krebs, NWDR Chor, Sinfonieorchester des Nordwestdeutschen Rundfunks (Hamburg) conducted by Hans Rosbaud
1966: Josef Greindl, Helmut Melchert, Städtische Oper Berlin conducted by Hermann Scherchen
1973: Günter Reich, Louis Devos, Chor und Sinfonieorchester des Österreichischen Rundfunks conducted by Michael Gielen (DVD)
1975: Günter Reich, Richard Cassilly, BBC Symphony Orchestra conducted by Pierre Boulez
1976: Werner Haseleu, Reiner Goldberg, Rundfunk-Sinfonie-Orchester Leipzig conducted by Herbert Kegel
1984: Franz Mazura, Philip Langridge, Chicago Symphony Orchestra and Chorus conducted by Georg Solti; Grammy Award for Best Opera Recording in 1986.
1996: David Pittman-Jennings, Chris Merritt, Royal Concertgebouw Orchestra conducted by Pierre Boulez
1999: John Tomlinson, Philip Langridge, Metropolitan Opera conducted by James Levine
2006: Wolfgang Schöne, Chris Merritt, Stuttgart State Orchestra conducted by Roland Kluttig
2006: Franz Grundheber, Thomas Moser, Vienna State Opera conducted by Daniele Gatti (DVD)
2010: Dale Duesing, Andreas Conrad, Ruhr Triennale conducted by Michael Boder (DVD)
2014: Franz Grundheber, Andreas Conrad, EuropaChorAkademie, SWR Sinfonieorchester Baden-Baden und Freiburg conducted by Sylvain Cambreling
2015: Thomas Johannes Mayer, John Graham-Hall, Opéra national de Paris conducted by Philippe Jordan (Blu-ray & DVD)
2015: Robert Hayward, John Daszak, Komische Oper Berlin conducted by Vladamir Jurowski, director Barrie Kosky (streamed 11 September 2020 to 12 June 2020)

References

External links 

Operas by Arnold Schoenberg
German-language operas
Unfinished operas
Compositions that use extended techniques
Operas completed by others
1932 operas
Twelve-tone compositions by Arnold Schoenberg
Operas based on the Bible
Cultural depictions of Moses
Aaron
Operas adapted into films
Operas